Perry (Parviz) Daneshgari is an Iranian-American entrepreneur, engineer and author born in Ahvaz, Iran.  He founded MCA, which appeared on the TV Program World Business Review, in 1990 and has written many books and articles in specialized magazines and websites. Perry has an MBA from Wayne State University and a Ph.D in Mechanical Engineering from the University of Karlsruhe, as well as BS. in Civil and Mechanical Engineering. He specializes in Agile Construction, a way of doing business that focuses on adaptation and quick changes on job sites and production lines.

Perry has collaborated with research projects on different industries, most of them focused on increasing productivity in those industries applying agile methods of working, for example: “Developing a Standard Format for Calculating Construction size and Share”, “Ideal Jobsite Inventory Levels to Improve Profitability” for Electri International and other organization like Sheet Metal and Air Conditioning Contractors National Association, NAED Education and Research Foundation, New Horizons Foundation, etc.. Perry in collaboration with Heather Moore and MCA have written articles in some specialized magazines like Electrical Contracting Magazine, The Electrical Distribution Magazine, and more.

Bibliography
Agile Construction for the electrical contractor 
The Chase: Constant Pursuit For Improvement
Lean Operations in Wholesale Distribution 
Agile Construction, a Profitable construction, higher profits and better cash flow.
Application of ASTM E2691  Standard Practice for Job Productivity Measurement in Agile Construction
Competing in the New Construction Environment: A Compilation to Lead the Way - The Here and Now-How to Be Competitive, Book 1:
Operational Model Needed to Compete in Industrialized Construction - Industrialization of Construction, A Compilation to Lead the Way, Book 2:
Industrialization of Construction, A Compilation to Lead the Way, Foundation and Future, Dealing with the Challenges of More Work, Book 3:
Efficiency and Continuous Improvement: Survival of the Unfits - Book 4:
Agile Distribution®, Application of Lean Principles:

References

External links
 P. Daneshgari profile on ECM
 P. Daneshgari on Inanimate to Animate Blog: Could the laws of physics explain our social behavior, and our connection to the universe?

American people of Iranian descent